The 2013–14 Longwood Lancers men's basketball team represented Longwood University during the 2013–14 NCAA Division I men's basketball season. The Lancers, led by first year head coach Jayson Gee, played their home games at Willett Hall and were members of the North Division of the Big South Conference. They finished the season 8–24, 3–13 in Big South play to finish in last place in the North division. They lost in the first round of the Big South tournament to Gardner–Webb.

Roster

Schedule 

|-
!colspan=9 style="background:#002B7F; color:#AFAAA3;"| Regular season

|-
!colspan=9 !colspan=9 style="background:#002B7F; color:#AFAAA3;"| Big South tournament

|-

Longwood Lancers men's basketball seasons
Longwood
Long
Long